WDNB (102.1 FM) is a radio station broadcasting a country music format. Licensed to Jeffersonville, New York, United States.  The station is currently owned by Bold Gold Media Group, L.P. The station is simulcast on WHNB (104.5 FM) in Hancock.

History
The station was assigned the call sign WWHW on August 21, 1998.  On February 10, 2000, the station changed its call sign to the current WDNB.

References

External links

DNB
Country radio stations in the United States
Radio stations established in 1999
1999 establishments in New York (state)